John Mundy (or Munday) (before 1555 – 29 June 1630) was an English composer, virginalist and organist of the Renaissance period.

Life and works
The son and pupil of the eminent composer William Mundy, he was organist at Eton, and succeeded John Marbeck after his death in 1585 as organist at St George's Chapel, Windsor. He received a bachelor of music degree from the University of Oxford in 1586, and his doctorate in 1624. In 1585 he was appointed joint organist of Westminster Abbey with Nathaniel Giles, a post he maintained until his death in 1630.

Mundy was one of the earliest English madrigalists. He published a volume of Songs and Psalms in 1594, and contributed a madrigal, Lightly she whipped o'er the dales, to The Triumphs of Oriana (1601), a compilation of madrigals by Thomas Morley in honour of Queen Elizabeth I. He composed sacred music in English and Latin, including music for the Book of Common Prayer, and is represented in the Fitzwilliam Virginal Book by five pieces, including a magnificent set of variations on the popular song Goe from my window and a whimsical but fine miniature, Munday's Joy. He also wrote a setting of the recusant Chidiock Tichborne's poem My prime of youth before the latter's gruesome execution in 1586 for his part in the Babington plot.

Mundy died on 29 June 1630 at Windsor, succeeded in his post there by his colleague Nathaniel Giles.

Compositions

Songs and Psalmes (pub. 1594)
For 3 voices
1. Praise the Lord, O my soul
2. Save me, O God
3. O all ye nations of the Lord
4. Blessed art thou that fearest God (1st part)
5. Thus art thou blest that fearest God (2nd part)
6. Hear my prayer, O Lord
7. Ye people all in one accord
8. O Lord, turn not away thy face
9. O come, let us lift up our voice
10. Of all the birds that I have heard
11. As I went a walking in the month of May
12. Turn about and see me
For 4 voices
13. Lord, to thee I make my moan
14. O Lord, of whom I do depend
15. Sing ye unto the Lord our God
16. I lift my heart to thee
17. My prime of youth
18. In deep distress
19. The longer that I live
20. The shepherd Strephon (1st part)
21. Witness, ye heavens (2nd part)
22. Heigh ho! I’ll go to plough no more
For 5 voices
23. Lord, arise and help thy servant
24. Have mercy on me, O Lord
25. Unto thee lift I up mine eyes
26. Were I a king
27. In midst of woods (1st part)
28. The blackbird (2nd part)
29. Penelope that longed for the night
30. Who loves a life
Lightly she whipped o'er the dales, madrigal, in 5 parts [pub. in The Triumphs of Oriana, 1601]

Sacred Vocal Music
Aedes nostra sancta, motet
Ah helpless wretch, anthem
Blessed be the Lord, sacred song, in 5 parts [possibly by William Mundy]
Blessed is God in all His gifts, anthem, in 7 parts
De Lamentatione, sacred motet
Dominus illuminatio mea, motet, in 3 parts
Dum transisset sabbatum, sacred responsory
Give laud unto the Lord, anthem, in 7 parts
In te Domine speravi, sacred motet
Judica me Deus, sacred motet
Kyrie 'lux et origo'
Let us now laud and magnify with music, anthem, in 4 parts
O give thanks unto the Lord for he is gracious, anthem, for 4, 5, or 7 parts
O God my strength and fortitude, anthem
O Lord, our governor, anthem, for 5 or 8 parts
Send aid and save me, anthem
Sicut erat, [motet], in 3 parts
Sing joyfully unto God our strength, anthem, in 5 parts
Thou hast make him lower

Instrumental Music
for keyboard
Fantasia [#II in Fitzwilliam Virginal Book]
Fantasia, Faire Wether, etc.  [#III in Fitzwilliam Virginal Book]
Robin [#XV in Fitzwilliam Virginal Book]
Goe from my Window [#XLII in Fitzwilliam Virginal Book]
Munday's Joy [#CCLXXXII in Fitzwilliam Virginal Book]

for instrumental consort
Judica me deus, motet without words, in 6 parts, for viols
In nōie, in 6 parts
In nōie, in 5 parts
[In nomine], in 6 parts [unnamed in original manuscript]
In nōie, in 5 parts

References
Jerome & Elizabeth Roche. A Dictionary of Early Music. Faber & Faber, London 1981. 
Elizabethan Consort Music, vols. 44-45 (ed. Paul Doe) (London, 1979–88)

External links

The English Madrigalists, vol. 35b: John Mundy, Songs and Psalms (ed. Edmund H. Fellowes, Thurston Dart) (London, 1924; rev. 1961) ISMN: 9790220211652
John Mundy Manuscripts at RISM (Répertoire International des Sources Musicales)
The Baldwin Collection of Motets, etc, R.M.24.d.2. (1590-1606), nos. 41, 46-49, 130 at The Aeolian Consort

English madrigal composers
English organists
British male organists
Renaissance composers
1550s births
1630 deaths
People of the Elizabethan era
16th-century English composers
Alumni of the University of Oxford
17th-century English composers
English male classical composers
English classical composers